James Doig (1894 – 1967) was a South African middle-distance runner. He competed in the men's 800 metres at the 1920 Summer Olympics.

References

External links
 

1894 births
1967 deaths
Athletes (track and field) at the 1920 Summer Olympics
South African male middle-distance runners
Olympic athletes of South Africa
Place of birth missing